Watkins Lake may refer to:

Watkins Lake (Waterford Township, Michigan), a lake in Oakland County
Watkins Lake, a lake in Martin County, Minnesota
Watkins Lake, a lake in Waseca County, Minnesota